Welton le Wold is a village and civil parish in the East Lindsey district of Lincolnshire, England.

The name 'Welton le Wold' derives from the Old English Wella-tun meaning 'farm/settlement with a spring/stream'. Wold was added to distinguish from the other villages named Welton in Lincolnshire.

Welton is listed in the Domesday Book of 1086 as consisting of 57 households.

The parish church is a Grade II* listed building dedicated to Saint Martin, dating from the 14th century and restored in 1849 by S. S. Teulon. The west tower and the font are 14th-century.

Welton le Wold C of E School was a red-brick school built as a national school in 1840 and reorganised as a junior school in 1928. It closed in July 1974 and is now Grade II listed.

References

External links
Village website

Civil parishes in Lincolnshire
Villages in Lincolnshire
East Lindsey District